Kainourgio was one of the provinces of the Heraklion Prefecture, Crete, Greece. Its territory corresponded with that of the current municipal units Gortyna, Moires, Rouvas and Zaros. It was abolished in 2006.

References

Heraklion (regional unit)
Provinces of Greece